The American Mediterranean Sea is a scientific name for the mediterranean dilution basin which includes the Caribbean Sea and the Gulf of Mexico. The name, which has been employed particularly by German oceanographers, is not recognized by the USGS, the International Hydrographic Organization or other international hydrological bodies.

Its basins include the Mexico Basin, the Cayman Trough, the Yucatan Basin, the Columbian Basin, the Venezuelan basin and the Grenada basin.

The American Mediterranean is considered one of the oceanic marginal seas. In addition to numerous small islands, large and small groups of islands, and islets, it includes the large islands of Cuba, bordering the Gulf of Mexico and the Caribbean; of Jamaica, Hispaniola, and of Puerto Rico. All of these islands are among the West Indian islands that separate the American Mediterranean from the Atlantic.

Between the islands, the American Mediterranean Sea contains the following straits: the Florida Straits, the Windward Passage (Paso de los Vientos), the Mona Passage (Canal de la Mona), the Anegada Passage to Guadeloupe Passage, the Dominica Passage to Martinique Passage, St. Lucia, and St. Vincent. Within the Mediterranean, the Straits of Yucatán to the Gulf of Mexico connect with the Caribbean, and by the Panama Canal, built in the 20th century, it is connected to the Pacific.

Watershed
Central American drainages include those of/to the Belize River, Gulf of Honduras, Caratasca Lagoon, Nicaraguan Caribbean Lowlands, and the Colorado River in Costa Rica.

See also 
Intra-Americas Sea
Ocean
Sea
Mediterranean sea (oceanography)

References

Mediterranean
North American watersheds of the Atlantic Ocean
South American drainage basins of the Atlantic Ocean